Galactica walsinghami is a moth in the family Galacticidae. It is found in Russia.

References

Moths described in 1920
Galacticidae